Aquilonastra is a genus of small sea stars within the family Asterinidae. It has over 20 described species.

Description 

Aquilonastra has generally five rays, except fissiparous species which have five to eight ones. It looks like a star, as inter-radial margins are deeply incurved.

List of species 
According to World Register of Marine Species and O'Loughlin & Rowe 2006:

 Aquilonastra anomala (H.L. Clark, 1921)
 Aquilonastra batheri (Goto, 1914)
 Aquilonastra burtoni (Gray, 1840)
 Aquilonastra byrneae O'Loughlin & Rowe, 2006
 Aquilonastra cepheus (Muller & Troschel, 1842)
 Aquilonastra chantalae O'Loughlin & MacKenzie, 2013
 Aquilonastra colemani O'Loughlin & Rowe, 2006
 Aquilonastra conandae O'Loughlin & Rowe, 2006
 Aquilonastra corallicola (Marsh, 1977)
 Aquilonastra coronata (von Martens, 1866)
 Aquilonastra doranae O'Loughlin & Rowe, 2006
 Aquilonastra halseyae O'Loughlin & Rowe, 2006
 Aquilonastra heteractis (H.L. Clark, 1938)
 Aquilonastra iranica (Mortensen, 1940)
 Aquilonastra limboonkengi (Smith, 1927)
 Aquilonastra marshae O'Loughlin & Rowe, 2006
 Aquilonastra minor (Hayashi, 1974)
 Aquilonastra moosleitneri O'Loughlin & Rowe, 2006
 Aquilonastra oharai O'Loughlin & Rowe, 2006
 Aquilonastra richmondi O'Loughlin & Rowe, 2006
 Aquilonastra rosea (H.L. Clark, 1938)
 Aquilonastra rowleyi O'Loughlin & Rowe, 2006
 Aquilonastra samyni O'Loughlin & Rowe, 2006
 Aquilonastra scobinata (Livingstone, 1933)
 Aquilonastra shirleyae O'Loughlin, 2009
 Aquilonastra watersi O'Loughlin & Rowe, 2006
 Aquilonastra yairi O'Loughlin & Rowe, 2006

References 

Asterinidae